Pio Marchi (1895 – December 1942) was an Italian professional footballer who played as a midfielder for Juventus. His younger brother Guido was also a professional footballer.

References

1895 births
1942 deaths
Italian footballers
Juventus F.C. players
Association football midfielders